Evangelia Anastasiadou (born 16 March 2002) is a Greek rower. She won a silver medal in the single sculls at the 2022 European Rowing Championships.

References

External links
 

2002 births
Living people
Greek female rowers
Rowers from Kastoria